The Exodus of Sarajevo Serbs was the migration of ethnic Serbs from Sarajevo, the capital of Bosnia and Herzegovina, between January and March 1996 after the Dayton Agreement that concluded the Bosnian War (1992–95).

Background 

The exodus of Sarajevo Serbs was one of many exoduses of Serbs during Bosnian War. Right before this exodus there was another exodus of 17,000 Serbs from Odžak. Both of them were preceded by massive exodus of more than 250,000 Serbs from Croatia during Operation Storm which set precedents for the exodus of Sarajevo Serbs. It was reported on 1 January 1996 that 'rumours and blind panic trigger mass flight from [the] city's contested suburbs'.

Exodus 
The Dayton Agreement finalized the demarcation between the Federation of Bosnia and Herzegovina (FBiH) and Republika Srpska (RS), the two post-war entities of the country. Ilijaš, Vogošća, Hadžići, Ilidža, Rajlovac and Grbavica were incorporated into FBiH, while other peripheral parts of the former Sarajevo municipality became part of RS (see Istočno Sarajevo). The Serb community massively left the FBiH part of Sarajevo for RS. Their number was first reported in 1996 as 62,000, but it is estimated that the total number was 150,000.

Australian professor Dino Murtić emphasized that exodus of Sarajevo Serbs was massive and planned and that Bosnian president Izetbegović initially demonstrated indifference about it stating that the people of Sarajevo "finally deserved to be free of their murderers". After some time, Izetbegović called Serbs to stay in Sarajevo.

Some Serbs exhumated the graves of their ancestors from Sarajevo graveyards to graveyards near their new accommodation.

Responsibility 
Some authors believed that all involved parties in Bosnia were responsible for the mass exodus of Sarajevo Serbs, including the officials of Republika Srpska. For some authors it was difficult to determine if this exodus was voluntarily or forced. Some authors explain that ethnic cleansing of Serbs from Croatia during Operation Storm (silently supported by major powers like United States and Germany) set precedent for the exodus of 150,000 terrified suburban Sarajevo Serbs who did not feel that a Muslim-led Bosnian government or the outside world will guarantee their safety.

In 1996, the Parliamentary Assembly of the Council of Europe cited the delay of the establishment of an international police force in Bosnia on the part of NATO as among the factors which contributed to Serbs leaving Sarajevo. It also noted the "systematic looting and torching" of Serbian suburbs of the city and the failure to prevent them as a reason for the exodus.

Media coverage 
The Western observers claimed that Serbs used mass exhumations during their exodus from Sarajevo to gain moral victory. Peter Brock argued that even after the 1996 exodus, the Western media still refused to acknowledge the flight of tens of thousands of Sarajevo Serbs that occurred at the beginning of the Bosnian War in early 1992. Even before the exodus of Sarajevo Serbs began, another exodus of 17,000 Serbs from Odžak went unnoticed in the public.

Eventually, the exodus of Sarajevo Serbs forced foreign journalists including Tom Gjelten to reconsider their initial judgement about Sarajevo being harmonious.

References

Sources

External links

History of the Serbs of Bosnia and Herzegovina
February 1996 events in Europe
March 1996 events in Europe
Bosnian War
History of Sarajevo
History of Republika Srpska
1996 in Bosnia and Herzegovina
Human migration